is a Japanese football player who plays for Fukushima United FC.

Club career
Having worked his way through the S-Pulse youth system, he signed full professional terms with at the start of the 2004 season. Yamamoto has thus far been a deputy to the omnipresent Yohei Nishibe.

National team career
In June 2005, Yamamoto was selected Japan U-20 national team for 2005 World Youth Championship. In August 2008, he was selected Japan U-23 national team for 2008 Summer Olympics. But he did not play in the match, as he was the team's reserve goalkeeper behind Shusaku Nishikawa both tournaments.

Club statistics
Updated to 10 April 2020.

1Includes Emperor's Cup.
2Includes J.League Cup.

References

External links

Profile at Yokohama FC

1985 births
Living people
Association football people from Shizuoka Prefecture
Japanese footballers
J1 League players
J2 League players
J3 League players
Shimizu S-Pulse players
Vissel Kobe players
JEF United Chiba players
Yokohama FC players
Roasso Kumamoto players
Fukushima United FC players
Footballers at the 2008 Summer Olympics
Olympic footballers of Japan
Association football goalkeepers